"Wildside" is a song by American hip-hop group Marky Mark and the Funky Bunch. It was released in October 1991 as the second single from their 1991 album Music for the People. It heavily samples Lou Reed's 1972 "Walk on the Wild Side". All vocals on the track are performed by the group's leader Mark Wahlberg.

Content
Boston pioneer rapper M.C. Spice (Amir Quadeer Shakir) co-wrote & co-produced the song, which describes the effects of America's greed, violence, and drug addiction on innocent, unsuspecting people. It referenced two notorious crimes that happened in Boston; the murder-suicide of Charles Stuart and his wife and the murder of 12-year-old Tiffany Moore shot as she sat on a stoop during a drive by shooting by a youth gang.  The early portion of the video features a few seconds of the burning of an American flag.

Originally recorded and performed by M.C. Spice, "Wildside" aired on Boston's W.I.L.D. Radio for nearly two years before Spice agreed to allow Wahlberg to record the song for the actor's debut album. However, Spice removed content which referenced his best friend, Wesley "DJ Wes" McDougald and Wesley's violent death. M.C. Spice still records under the name Quadeer Shakur and M.C. Spice, and is founder of the BlackBerry Soul Radio online music station.

Chart performance
"Wildside" followed the success of the group's previous single, "Good Vibrations", and peaked at number 10 on the Billboard Hot 100, becoming the group's second and final top-40 single.

Charts

Weekly charts

Year-end charts

References

1991 singles
Marky Mark and the Funky Bunch songs
Songs written by Lou Reed
Songs written by Mark Wahlberg
1991 songs